St Mary's, also known as St Mary the Virgin, is an ancient Grade I listed Church of England parish church located in Morpeth, Northumberland. The church is to the south of the River Wansbeck in Morpeth, which is an area known as High Church. The oldest remaining parts of the structure belong to the Transitional Early English style of the mid to late 12th century, but the church is mostly in the 14th century style. The church, which was the main Anglican place of worship in the area until the 1840s, has been restored several times after being destroyed by the Scandinavians, Scottish and Cromwellians in the 10th and later centuries.

The grave of Emily Wilding Davison, a suffragette who was killed when she fell under the King's horse during The Derby in 1913, lies in St Mary's graveyard. Her gravestone bears the slogan of the Women's Social and Political Union: "Deeds not words".

References

External links 
 

Morpeth, Northumberland
Church of England church buildings in Northumberland